is a Japanese singer and actor. He is a member of Hey! Say! JUMP.

Yamada came to prominence as a teen idol in 2007 following his role in the Japanese television series Tantei Gakuen Q. After launching his music career in 2007 as a member of Hey! Say! JUMP, he released his number one debut solo single, "Mystery Virgin" in 2013. The fact that Yamada was in his teens at the time the single reached number one helped the singer set several records in the Japanese music industry and Yamada achieved wide fame as a solo artist. He became the first teenage male artist in thirty three years to have a number one debut single as well as being one of the only two artists in history to achieve this milestone.

As an actor, he is best known for portraying Hajime Kindaichi in the Kindaichi Case Files live action drama franchise and Nagisa Shiota in the Assassination Classroom live action adaptation movie franchise. He also plays Edward Elric in the live-action film Fullmetal Alchemist, which was released on December 1, 2017.

Yamada's portrayal of Shiota Nagisa in Assassination Classroom (2015) earned him the Japan Academy Award for Newcomers of the Year in 2016 and his role as Semi in Grasshopper (2015) won him the Rookie Actor of the Year in Japan Film Critics Award 2016.

Career

2004–2005: Career beginnings
Yamada began his career as an entertainer after entering Johnny & Associates at the age of ten. His mother, who was a fan of KinKi Kids, sent an application for an audition which recruited trainees for future male idols. The audition took place during the summer of 2004 and was aired in a segment of a Japanese television program, Ya-Ya-yah. Yamada made his first television appearance in August.

He began working as a backup dancer for Tackey & Tsubasa, NEWS, Kanjani8, and KAT-TUN and appeared regularly on Shounen Club from autumn 2004.

2006–2007: Tantei Gakuen Q and Hey! Say! JUMP
Following his success as a dancer, he began acting. In 2006, he made his acting debut in a two-hour television live action drama, Tantei Gakuen Q SP, as Ryu Amakusa.

In April 2007, he was selected to be a member of a temporary group, Hey! Say! 7. The group made their CD debut on August 1, 2007, with a number-one single "Hey! Say!". The band was created by Johnny Kitagawa and it was stated at the time that it would be active for six months until September 2007.

From July 2007, a three-month series of Tantei Gakuen Q was launched and Yamada played Ryu Amakusa again as he did in the prequel. The series became a major hit, and Yamada came to prominence and began receiving wide fame as an actor.

In September 2007, Hey! Say! 7 expanded. Johnny & Associates announced that the new group, Hey! Say! JUMP, would be launched. Yamada was selected as one of the ten (now eight) members. He debuted on November 14, 2007, with a number one single "Ultra Music Power".

2008–2009: Acting and NYC Boys
In 2008, Yamada furthered his acting career. From January to March 2008, he starred in a three-month long television drama series, One-Pound Gospel with Kazuya Kamenashi. On April 12, he played a main role in a two-hour drama episode, Sensei wa Erai, as Hayato Gunjou.

On June 14, he played the main role in Furuhata Chuugakusei, the sequel to Furuhata Ninzaburo, a Japanese drama series aired since 1994.

From October to December 2008, he played the main role, Toichi Takasugi, in a three-month long television drama series, Scrap Teacher, along with Daiki Arioka, Yuto Nakajima and Yuri Chinen.

In June 2009, it was announced that Yamada would be working as the lead singer of temporary group, NYC Boys. The band debuted with a number one single, "NYC". On December 31, 2009, the band appeared on Kohaku Uta Gassen.

In the summer of 2009, Yamada returned to acting and starred in Niini no koto o Wasurenaide, a two-hour television drama episode aired as a segment of an annual television show, 24 Hour Television.

On October 3, 2009, he played the main role in Hidarime Tantei Eye SP.

2010–2012: NYC, The Smurfs, Perfect Son and Johnny's World
From January 2010, Hidarime Tantei EYE became a three-month long television series and Yamada once again played the main role. His bandmate Yuma Nakayama guest starred in the first two episodes. Hey! Say! JUMP's sixth single "Hitomi no Screen" was used as the theme song for the series.

In March 2010, it was announced that Yamada and two other leading members of NYC boys would form a new group called NYC, leaving behind the remaining four members. NYC released a number one single "Yuuki 100%" on April 7, 2010. From this point on, Yamada began performing as a singer of two groups, Hey! Say! JUMP and NYC.

In September 2011, he played the voice of Clumsy in the Japanese-dubbed version of the film The Smurfs. Hey! Say! JUMP's ninth single, "Magic Power", was used as the theme song for the film.

In 2012, Yamada returned to acting for the first time in two years. He played the main role in Yamada Akiyoshi Monogatari, which was aired on January 2. It was his first time to star in a period drama. From January to March, he starred in a 3-month long television series, Perfect Son, with actress Kyōka Suzuki. Hey! Say! JUMP's 9th single "SUPER DELICATE" was used as the theme song for the series.

From November 2012 to January 2013, he played the lead role in a musical, Johnny's World. For the musical, Yamada performed tight-rope walking every day for three months in each show.

2013–2014: "Mystery Virgin" and Kindaichi Case Files
On January 9, 2013, he made his solo debut with a number one single, "Mystery Virgin". The fact that Yamada was in his teens at the time when the single reached number one helped him set several new records in the Japanese music industry. The single debuted at number one in its debut week on the Oricon chart, making him the first teenage male artist in thirty-three years to have a number one debut single as well as being one of the only two artists in history to achieve this milestone.

On January 12, 2013, he starred in a two-hour television special for, Kinda'ichi Shōnen no Jikenbo titled Kindaichi Shonen no Jikenbo Hong Kong Kowloon Zaihou Satsujin Jiken (The Hong Kong Kowloon Treasure Murder Case). He played the main role as Hajime Kindaichi. The show was created to celebrate the 60th anniversary of the Japanese broadcasting company, NTV. Yamada's Mystery Virgin was used as the theme song for the show.

It was later revealed that Shin Kibayashi, writer of the Kindaichi series and Tantei Gakuen Q had envisioned creating a new Kindaichi series with Yamada as Hajime Kindaichi for almost five years. They met on set while filming Tantei Gakuen Q in 2006 and 2007. After filming the show, Kibayashi asked Yamada in person if he could play the role of Kindaichi in the future, for Yamada was only 14 years old at the time, too young to play the role of a high school student.

In early 2014, Ryosuke Yamada reprised his role as Kindaichi and starred in another special titled Kindaichi Shonen no Jiken bo Gokumonjuku Satsujin Jiken (The Prison School Murder Case).

After the specials, Ryosuke was then approached to continue starring as Kindaichi for a new serial drama for the Kindaichi series. The new series will be titled Kindaichi Shonen no Jikenbo N (neo) and started airing in July 2014.

2015: Movie debut and 24 Hour Television
In March 2015, Yamada made his movie debut as the hero, Shiota Nagisa, in the live-action movie adaptation of the popular manga, Assassination Classroom. The movie was a major hit, topping the box office of Japan on its first opening week.

In August 2015, Hey! Say! JUMP was chosen as the TV personality of NTV's annual 24 Hour Television, which was a program to raise awareness for all the people that are going through hard times, alongside another Johnny's group, V6. Yamada portrayed the hero, Ryohei Sasaki, in the 24 Hour Television drama special called Okaasan, Ore Wa Daijoubu, along with other Johnny's members Takahisa Masuda and Yoshihiko Inohara as cast members. He portrayed a high school student who's passionate about soccer, but suffers from a brain tumor. For the role, Yamada lost 6 kg within just a week. In 2022, he was chosen as host personality again, together with the other members of the YouTube channel Jyaninochannel.

Yamada was cast in another movie that was released on November 9 called Grasshopper along with Toma Ikuta. The movie was ranked number two on its opening week. Yamada received positive reviews due to his acting as a knife-wielding assassin in this movie, including from his veteran co-stars, Toma Ikuta, Tadanobu Asano, and Jun Murakami.

2016–present: Continuous Movie Successes & Acting Recognitions 
Early 2016, Yamada won the Newcomer of the Year category in the 39th Japan Academy Prize for his portrayal of Nagisa Shiota in Assassination Classroom, and Rookie actor of the year in Japan Movie Critics Award for his portrayal of Semi in Grasshopper.

On May 24, 2016, it was announced that Yamada would star as Edward Elric in the Fullmetal Alchemist live-action movie scheduled for release in 2017.

Yamada was cast as the lead to the fall drama of Fuji TV's getsu 9 (prime-time slot), Cain and Abel. It aired in October 2016. It is Yamada's first drama with a romantic love angle, and he is also the first Heisei born from Johnny's to star in a getsu 9. The story is adapted from the Bible's Old Testament, and it is also a remake of the US classic film, East of Eden starring James Dean. Yamada plays a salaryman who falls in love with his brother's girlfriend and is hungry for the affection of his father. For his role in this drama, Yamada was a runner up of Best Leading Actor in the Autumn TV Drama Academy Award 2016. He was also the youngest person to be nominated in the lead actor category that season.

On December 2, 2016, Yamada was cast to lead a movie titled Miracles of the Namiya General Store based on the best-selling novel of the same name by an award-winning writer, Higashino Keigo. The novel was claimed to be one of Higashino's best works. It tells the story of two people living in different eras (1980 and 2012) which will be connected by a letter, a story depicting human bonds and miracles. Yamada will portray a delinquent who stumbles upon a mysterious store that leads to several events that changes his life. The movie will be directed by Ryuichi Hiroki, filming expected to start January 2017 and is slated for Autumn 2017 release.

Yamada's performance in the "Miracles of the Namiya General Store" received generally positive reviews. His co-star Nishida Toshiyuki praised Yamada's performance and said he is the Japanese version of James Dean and wrote a special letter for Yamada appreciating his acting. The movie was nominated for 6 different categories at the 41st Japan Academy Award, including best picture and best director.

Both Namiya and Fullmetal Alchemist debuted at number 1 in Japan Box Office for its opening weekend. Yamada's performance as Atsuya in Namiya and Edward Elric in Fullmetal Alchemist earn him the Newcomer Actor Award at the 91st Kinema Junpo Award, making him the second Johnny's talent to achieve this award after Ikuta Toma.

Yamada was cast as the lead to the NTV Saturday 10p.m drama for the winter of 2018, with the title Momikeshite Fuyu, a family comedy drama that tells the story of 3 elite siblings of a doctor, a lawyer, and a police officer who struggles to cover up scandals related to their family. Yamada plays the youngest child, an elite Police Officer, graduated from the University of Tokyo, who struggles to be accepted by his family under the shadows of his older siblings. The series premiered on January 13, 2018, with a solid rating of 13.3%.

Discography

Singles

Music video

Credits

DVD

|october 2022
|Shinai boku e satsui o komete
|}

Filmography

Dramas

Film

Shows

Other activities

YouTube
A new Johnny's YouTube channel called ジャにのちゃんねる (Janinochaneru), lead by Arashi's Kazunari Ninomiya, was opened on April 25, 2021. Yamada was revealed as the fourth member to participate, on April 28. He was revealed in the channel's 4th official video following 3 others announcing the other Johnny's members that would be a part of the new channel.

On September 15 of the same year, Yamada started his own gaming channel, LEOの遊び場 (Leo's Playground). On this channel, Yamada mainly streams gameplay of first-person shooter games, featuring other Japanese streamers and VTubers.

Tours
For post-debut tours, see Hey! Say! JUMP.

Pre-debut

Musicals

Awards

References

External links
 Hey! Say! JUMP
 Johnny's-net

1993 births
Living people
Hey! Say! JUMP members
Johnny & Associates
Horikoshi High School alumni
Male actors from Tokyo
Singers from Tokyo
Japanese male pop singers
Japanese dance music singers
Japanese rhythm and blues singers
Japanese male television actors
Japanese male child actors
Japanese male film actors
Japanese idols
21st-century Japanese singers
21st-century Japanese male singers
21st-century Japanese male actors